The Georgia Boy Choir is an American boys' choir based in Atlanta, Georgia, founded in 2009 by David White. In the fall of 2010, it was announced that the Georgia Boy Choir was named the Ensemble-In-Residence at Peachtree Rd. United Methodist Church.

History

The Georgia Boy Choir was founded in 2009 by David White, former director of the Atlanta Boy Choir and the Florida's Singing Sons Boy choir.

The Georgia Boy Choir operates on a five-tier system of musical education for boys as young as five years old through high school. The choirs range from the youngest members in the Apprentice Choir to the oldest members of the Young Men's Ensemble.

Performances

The choir's inaugural tour was to China, where it performed at venues like Beijing University and the Chengdu Concert Hall. The 2012 tour was to Scandinavia with performances in Copenhagen, Denmark, Oslo, Norway and Estonia. The choir has also performed locally for the Atlanta Regional Commission, the Governor of Georgia, the Atlanta Rotary Club, and the Fish Radio Station. During the 2013 NBA Playoffs, the choir sang the National Anthem for the final game between the Atlanta Hawks and the Indiana Pacers.

References

External links
Official Site

Boys' and men's choirs
Choirs of children